The 2021 Africa U-17 Cup of Nations qualification was a men's under-17 football competition which decided the teams that would have participated in the 2021 Africa U-17 Cup of Nations.

Players born 1 January 2004 or later were eligible to participate in the competition. A total of twelve teams qualified and would have played in the final tournament, including Morocco who qualified automatically as hosts.

Teams

This will be the first edition in Africa U-17 Cup of Nations to have expanded to 12 teams instead of eight. Each of the six zones received two spots in the final tournament.

Notes
Teams in bold qualified for the final tournament.
(H): Qualifying tournament hosts
(Q): Automatically qualified for final tournament regardless of qualification results
(D): Disqualified

Schedule
The qualifying competition is split into regional competitions, with the teams entering the qualifying tournament of their zone.  The final arrangements of the zonal qualifiers were decided later due to the delays caused by the COVID-19 pandemic. The schedule of each qualifying zone is as follows.

North Zone

The UNAF U-17 Tournament, which also served as the qualifiers for the Africa U-17 Cup of Nations was initially planned to be hosted by Algeria between 15–24 July 2020. However, it could not be held in the scheduled time span because of the COVID-19 pandemic and was later scheduled and held between 18–24 January 2021. The matches were played at Algiers (Stade du 5 Juillet).

The draw for the fixtures was held on 30 December 2020. The three teams were placed in one group, with the winners qualifying for the final tournament. Morocco didn't participate in the qualifiers as they had already qualified as the hosts of the final tournament.

All times are local, CET (UTC+1).

<onlyinclude>

West A Zone
The 2021 WAFU Zone A Tournament which serves as the qualifiers for the Africa U-17 Cup of Nations was initially planned to be hosted from 11–20 December 2020 in Sierra Leone, but was postponed. The tournament was later shifted and held in Senegal between 5–13 February 2021.

Group stage

Group A

<onlyinclude>

Group B

<onlyinclude>

Knockout stage

In the knockout stages, if a match is level at the end of normal playing time, a penalty shoot-out without extra time was used to determine the winners.

Semifinals

Final

West B Zone
The 2021 WAFU Zone B Tournament which serves as a qualifier tournament for the Africa U-17 Cup of Nations was initially planned to be hosted by Benin from 15–30 June 2020, but was later  shifted and held in Togo between 5–18 January 2021. The matches were played at Lomé (Stade de Kégué and Stade Municipal).

All times are local, GMT (UTC±0).

Group stage
The seven teams were drawn into two groups of three and four teams. The winners and the runners-up of each group advanced to the semi-finals.

Group A

Group B

Knockout stage

In the knockout stages, if a match is level at the end of normal playing time, a penalty shoot-out without extra time was used to determine the winners.

Semifinals

Third Place match

Final

Central Zone
The 2021 UNIFFAC U17 Tournament which would have served as a qualifier tournament for the Africa U-17 Cup of Nations  was initially planned to be held in Cameroon on 2020, and then in Malabo, Equatorial Guinea in February 2021. 

In February 2021, this tournament was finally cancelled by CAF due to the absence of a host country and the absence of an MRI machine in most of the countries of this zone. For the 2021 Africa U-17 Cup of Nations, CAF decided to qualify Cameroon and Congo, the two finalists of the last edition of the zonal qualifiers of UNIFFAC in 2018.

Central-East Zone

The CECAFA qualifiers for the Africa U-17 Cup of Nations were initially planned to be hosted at the beginning of July 2020 but were then later shifted to 13–22 December 2020. Nine teams were drawn into three groups of three teams during the draw made in October. However, two teams, namely Eritrea and Sudan withdrew before the start of the tournament and the seven remaining teams were then redrawn into new groups. The matches were played at Gisenyi (Umuganda Stadium).

All times are local, CAT (UTC+2).

Group stage
The seven teams were drawn into two groups of three and four teams. The winners and the runners-up of each group advanced to the semi-finals.

Group A
<onlyinclude>

Group B
<onlyinclude>

Knockout stage

In the knockout stages, if a match is level at the end of normal playing time, a penalty shoot-out without extra time was used to determine the winners.

Semifinals

Third Place match

Final

South Zone

The COSAFA U-17 Championship was initially planned to be hosted by Malawi between 22 July–1 August 2020 with the matches planned to be played at Blantyre, as the region's qualifying tournament. Malawi, however, were not able to host the tournament due to the COVID-19 pandemic. The hosting rights were later awarded to South Africa with the matches being played at Nelson Mandela Bay (Gelvandale Stadium and Westbourne Oval Stadium).

All times are local, SAST (UTC+2).

Group stage

Eight teams were drawn into two groups during the draw. South Africa, Angola, Zimbabwe, and Eswatini were drawn into Group A and Zambia, Botswana, Malawi and Comoros were drawn into Group B. However, on 20 November after the first set of matches were already played on 19 November, 4 teams namely – Botswana, Comoros, Eswatini and Zimbabwe were disqualified from the tournament for having at least one of their players fail the magnetic resonance imaging (MRI) test. The tournament was later restarted on 22 November 2020 as a four-team tournament and was played on a round-robin basis. The matches which had been played were then later regarded as warm-up games with no bearing to the new tournament format.

Third place match

Final

Qualified teams
The following 12 teams qualify for the final tournament.

1 Bold indicates champions for that year. Italic indicates hosts for that year.

Goalscorers

Notes

References

U-17 Championship qualification
Africa U-17 Cup of Nations qualification
Qualification
2021
November 2020 sports events in Africa
December 2020 sports events in Africa
January 2021 sports events in Africa
February 2021 sports events in Africa
Association football events postponed due to the COVID-19 pandemic